The golden spotted thick-toed gecko (Pachydactylus oculatus) is a species of lizard in the family Gekkonidae. It is endemic to South Africa.

References

Pachydactylus
Geckos of Africa
Endemic reptiles of South Africa
Reptiles described in 1927
Taxa named by John Hewitt (herpetologist)